Nigel Edwards is a health policy researcher, appointed Chief Executive at the Nuffield Trust in April 2014.

He was formerly an expert advisor with KPMG’s Global Centre of Excellence for Health and Life Sciences, a Senior Fellow at The King’s Fund. He was Policy Director of the NHS Confederation for 11 years.

He has commented on government announcements about the English NHS, such as George Osborne's promise to find extra cash for the NHS, and the reconfiguration of cancer services in Staffordshire.  In 2014 he is reported as saying " that   "there's nothing intrinsically bad about private or public sector provision", and that   the Better Care Fund might live up to the advertised savings if it concentrated entirely on moving people out of hospital into residential care.

He was reckoned by the Health Service Journal to be the 42nd most influential person in the English NHS in 2015.

As of autumn 2017 Edwards is concerned about the condition and funding of the NHS.  Edwards stated, “It is indisputable that the NHS is facing a yet another difficult winter. But whether or not it experiences a full-blown crisis will depend largely on unpredictable events, like a sudden outbreak of flu or norovirus. What is clear is that, seven years into austerity, the pressure on the system is immense, making the health service much less resilient to these kinds of events than is comfortable.”

In drawing lessons from the COVID-19 pandemic in England he says the emphasis on building hospitals as inexpensively as possible. led to situations that proved highly problematic when hospital staff were faced with large numbers of infectious patients.

References

Living people
Health policy
Year of birth missing (living people)